Colombo Terminus Station was the primary railway station in Colombo, Sri Lanka in the nineteenth century.  It was retired from service at the beginning of the twentieth century and replaced by Maradana Station.  The preserved building is now home to the National Railway Museum.

History 
Colombo Terminus Station was opened in 1865 to serve all trains at Colombo.

In 1906, a project was launched to reorganise the railway within the Colombo area.  Colombo Terminus Station was closed and replaced by the new Maradana Station.

Today the station is the site of the National Railway Museum.

Features 
Terminus Station was originally the end of the Main Line.  The construction of the Coast Line towards Slave Island turned the Terminus Station into a quarter-mile-long siding, making operation inconvenient.

Instead of a clock, a sundial was originally used to tell the time.  This would have avoided the cost of installing a mechanically-operated clock.

See also 
 Railway stations in Sri Lanka
 Maradana Railway Station
 Colombo Fort Railway Station
 Sri Lanka Railways

References 

Railway stations on the Main Line (Sri Lanka)
Railway stations opened in 1865
Railway stations in Colombo
Railway stations closed in 1908